is an athletic stadium in Fukushima, Fukushima, Japan.

It was formerly known as Azuma Athletic Stadium. Since May 2013 it has been called Toho Stadium for the naming rights by Toho Bank.

It was one of the home stadia of football club Fukushima United FC.

Facility overview 
Japan Athletics Federation Class 1 Official Recognition
Track: 400m×9 lanes
Surface Natural grass ground
Field size: 105m×70m
Capacity: 21,000 (Main Stand: 6,500 seats), Lawn Stand: 14,000)
However, in the J.League, as a rule, grass seats and buffer zones are not added to the capacity, so it is introduced as "6,464 people who can enter".
Lighting equipment: 1,500L x 4 units
Large video equipment: High-brightness full-color LEDs (installed in 2014) Installed near corners 1 and 2
Ancillary Facilities: Auxiliary athletic stadium 1 lap 400m×8 courses, all-weather pavement (with night lighting)

Naming rights 
Naming rights are solicited for the purpose of raising maintenance and operating costs for this stadium. There were applications from two companies in Fukushima Prefecture, a contract was signed in May 2013 with the Toho Bank.  The contact was due to terminate 31/03/2018.
The total value of the contract is 52.5 million yen.
Alternative name is "Toho Minna no Stadium" (abbreviation: Tousuta).

References

External links 

Toho Stadium (Azuma Athletic Stadium)
Azuma Park

Football venues in Japan
Sports venues in Fukushima Prefecture
Fukushima United FC
Fukushima (city)
Sports venues completed in 1994
1994 establishments in Japan